Lucien Sarti (October 8th, 1937 – April 28, 1972) was a French drug trafficker.

Drug smuggling
On April 19th, 1968, Sarti was arrested along with Auguste Ricord and François Chiappe for questioning regarding the robbery of a branch of the National Bank of Argentina. The three were released due to lack of evidence. In April 1972, Sarti was shot to death in Mexico City during a raid of a drug trafficking ring by the Mexican federal police. A detective in Rio de Janeiro was later suspended from the police force after being accused of accepting a bribe to free Sarti and Helena Ferreira, his girlfriend, from jail earlier in 1972. In January 1975, four French citizens alleged to have supplied heroin to Sarti were among a group of 19 indicted by a federal grand jury in Brooklyn.

Allegations of involvement in the assassination of John F. Kennedy

The Murderers of John F. Kennedy and The Men Who Killed Kennedy
In November 1988, Steve J. Rivele's French-published book The Murderers of John F. Kennedy named Sarti as one of three French gangsters involved in the assassination of John F. Kennedy. Rivele claimed Sarti fired the fatal shot from Dealey Plaza's "grassy knoll". According to Rivele, Sarti, Roger Bocagnani, and Sauveur Pironti were contracted by organized crime in the United States to protect their drug interests. The British two-hour television special The Men Who Killed Kennedy was based on Rivele's book, but preceded its release airing on October 25, 1988. In the French newspaper Le Provençal published the day following the special, Pironti denied the allegation, stating that he believed at the time of the assassination that Sarti was held in Marseille's Baumettes Prison and that Bocagnani was in Bordeaux's Fort du Hâ. He also showed the paper military records proving that he was serving on a minesweeper from October 1962 to April 1964. The French Ministry of Justice stated that Bocagnani was in prison on the day of Kennedy's assassination and officials from the French Navy confirmed Pironti's military service.

E. Howard Hunt
After the death of E. Howard Hunt in 2007, Howard St. John Hunt and David Hunt stated that their father had recorded several claims about himself and others being involved in a conspiracy to assassinate John F. Kennedy. In the April 5th, 2007 issue of Rolling Stone, Howard St. John Hunt detailed a number of individuals purported to be implicated by his father including Sarti, as well as Lyndon B. Johnson, Cord Meyer, David Phillips, Frank Sturgis, David Morales, and William Harvey. The two sons alleged that their father cut the information from his memoirs, American Spy: My Secret History in the CIA, Watergate and Beyond, to avoid possible perjury charges. According to Hunt's widow and other children, the two sons took advantage of Hunt's loss of lucidity by coaching and exploiting him for financial gain. The Los Angeles Times said they examined the materials offered by the sons to support the story and found them to be "inconclusive".

Further reading
Davis, John H. Mafia Kingfish: Carlos Marcello and the Assassination of John F. Kennedy. New York: Signet, 1989. 
Kruger, Henrik. The Great Heroin Coup: Drugs, Intelligence, and International Fascism. Boston: South End Press, 1980. 
Marrs, Jim. Crossfire: The Plot That Killed Kennedy. New York: Carroll & Graf, 1990. 
Mills, James. The Underground Empire: Where Crime and Governments Embrace. Garden City NY: Doubleday, 1986. 
Scott, Peter Dale and Marshall, Jonathan. Cocaine Politics: Drugs, Armies, and the CIA in Central America. Berkeley: University of California Press, 1991. 
Sterling, Claire. Octopus: The Long Reach of the International Sicilian Mafia. New York: Simon & Schuster (Touchstone Edition), 1991.

See also
French Connection

References

External links
The Men Who Killed Kennedy - an article on the TV series, which mentions David's claim of Sarti's involvement.

1937 births
1972 deaths
French Connection gangsters
People associated with the assassination of John F. Kennedy
People from Corsica